Chrysops pachycnemius is a species of deer fly in the family Tabanidae.

Distribution
Mexico, Guatemala, El Salvador.

References

Tabanidae
Insects described in 1905
Diptera of North America
Fauna of Guatemala